A Time to Keep is a play written by David Edgar and Stephanie Dale.

It is the fifth play to be specifically written for community actors in Dorchester, with the aim of providing a rollicking story with many roles. The "community play" contains over 100 characters, from George III and his court to the criminal classes. The original production featured over 130 actors and was directed by Jon Oram with music by Tim Laycock.

Plot 

In the summer of 1804 a group of women decide to put on a play to entertain the troops and George III.

Set against the backdrop of the threatened Napoleonic invasion of 1804, A Time to Keep inhabits terrain somewhere between Jane Austen and Charles Dickens, with its ambitious middle classes, its garrison of eligible officers, and its impoverished low-life. Driving the plot is an unlikely but passionate romance between a well-born but feisty young woman and the youngest son of a family of notorious smugglers.

Original cast 

King George III - Mike Roberts
Queen Charlotte - Sue Theobald
Princess Augusta - Emily Taylor
Princess Mary - Tanya Harrison
Princess Sophia - Izzie Hall
Henrietta Stickland - Miranda Blazeby 
Caroline Waldegrave - Rose Swann
Elizabeth Waldegrave - Daphne Payne
General Charles Fitzroy - Anthony Thorpe
General Garth - John Ramsden
Ann Mason - Ann Jonathan
Mary Stickland - Natalie Wakelin
Betty Sanger - Jessica Holloway
Edith Oldis - Angie Ramsden
George Corbin - Roan Doyle
Jane Harvey - Clare Daniel
Martha Ayres - Sarah Peterkin
Rebecca Brindle - Joy Wallis
Sara Bly - Sue McGarel
Susan Thorne - Sheila Johns
Captain Count Kielmanregge - Joseph Parsons
Major James Brine - Peter Rothman
Captain Joseph Hagley - Lee Fowgies
Lieutenant Frederick Baron Uslau - Ken McGregor
Excise Man 1 - Kevin Morris
Excise Man 2 - David Reeve
Recruiting Sergeants - Darren Richards and Kevin Morris
Issac Gulliver - Craig Besant

---This Cast List is incomplete at this time---

Reviews 
"A Time to Keep is a brilliant piece of theatre”
“Beautifully crafted, witty and well paced”
“Immersive and strangely moving”
"It is cheering to see a noble and communal art resurrected with such conviction", Luke Kennard, The Times Literary Supplement.

“A spirit lifting evening”
“Filled with an infectious happy energy”
“This is theatre at its fundamental level: a shared, imaginative experience, communicated with winning passion”
The Guardian - four stars

The future 
A Time to Keep was adapted for twenty actors and staged at LAMDA in autumn 2009 and then tour to the Lake District later that year. Directed by Penny Cherns. Musical Direction by Tim Laycock.

It was performed by a group of second-year Drama students at Loughborough University.

The play is published by Nick Hern Books. and is available for licensing.

References 

Plays by David Edgar
Fiction set in 1804